is a football and athletics stadium located in Ichihara, Japan. Completed in 1987, the stadium consists of a large main stand and several smaller stands in a ring. Approximately 500 seats are covered; the cold Ichihara winds tend to create an uncomfortable experience for most patrons.

It was formerly known as Ichihara Stadium. Since April 2013 it has been called ZA Oripri Stadium for the naming rights.

From 1993 until 2005 the stadium was home to J.League side JEF United Chiba until the club moved to its new home at the Fukuda Denshi Arena in Chiba, it remains to be seen if the club will still use Seaside Stadium as an alternate venue though it is currently used by JEF Reserves, which play football in a regional league.

See also
JEF United Chiba
Fukuda Denshi Arena

Football venues in Japan
JEF United Chiba
Sports venues in Chiba Prefecture
Ichihara, Chiba
Sports venues completed in 1993
1993 establishments in Japan